That Night a Forest Grew is an EP by The Clientele. The EP was officially announced and titled 16 May 2008 on the band's official website.

Track listing
 "Retiro Park" – 4:26
 "Share the Night" – 3:44
 "George Says He Has Lost His Way In This World" – 3:12
 "That Night, a Forest Grew" – 3:18

References

External links
That Night, a Forest Grew at eMusic

2008 EPs
The Clientele albums